Oreichthys coorgensis is a small cyprinid fish found in Western Ghats, India. It is endemic to the Cauvery River in Karnataka.

References

Fish of India
Oreichthys
Fish described in 1982